Hakea florulenta, commonly known as three-nerved willow hakea, is a woody shrub in the family Proteaceae and is endemic to eastern Australia.

Description
More rarely sharply pointed,  tapering at an acute angle. Between 14 and 20 white flowers appear on each inflorescence on a short stalk in the leaf axils. The surface has blackish blister-like protuberances tapering to a short beak. Flowers from September to December.

Taxonomy
Hakea florulenta was first formally described in 1855 by Carl Meissner from a specimen collected near Moreton Bay by Frederick Strange (1826 - 1854), who was killed by Aborigines whilst collecting near Mackay. The description was published in Hooker's Journal of Botany and Kew Garden Miscellany. The specific epithet (florulenta) is a Latin word meaning "abounding in flowers" or "flowering profusely".

Distribution and habitat
Hakea florulenta occurs in coastal areas of south-eastern Queensland and northern New South Wales from Bundaberg south to Grafton. Found growing in open forest, often associated with Melaleuca on sand or sandstone sometimes in poorly drained areas.

References

florulenta
Flora of New South Wales
Flora of Queensland
Plants described in 1855